Amblypomacentrus breviceps, known commonly as the black-banded demoiselle , is a species of marine fish in the family Pomacentridae, the damselfishes and the clownfishes.

Distribution and habitat
It is widespread throughout the tropical waters of the western Pacific Ocean.

Description
It's a small size fish that can reach a maximum size of 8,5 cm length.

References

External links
 

breviceps
Fish described in 1839
Taxa named by Salomon Müller
Taxa named by Hermann Schlegel